Freirina Airport ,  is an airport serving Freirina, a river town in the Atacama Region of Chile.

There is distant high terrain in all quadrants.

See also

Transport in Chile
List of airports in Chile

References

External links
OpenStreetMap - Freirina
SkyVector - Freirina
FallingRain - Freirina Airport

Airports in Atacama Region